David Abner Sr. (1826–1902) was an American politician who served in the Texas House of Representatives.

Born into slavery in Selma, Alabama, he served in the Fourteenth Texas Legislature for District 5 and sat on the Education Committee. He was a delegate to the 1875 Texas Constitutional Convention.

Early life
At the age of seventeen, Abner in 1843 was taken to Upshur County in East Texas. After being emancipated after the American Civil War, he moved to Marshall in Harrison County, also in East Texas. There he rented a plot of land and a mule from the sister of his original master. A few years later, he purchased the farm and became wealthy.

Political life
In 1873, Abner was appointed to the executive committee of the first Colored Men's State Convention. Later, he was elected to the position of treasurer for Harrison County. In 1874, Abner was elected to the legislature for Harrison and Rusk counties.

Halfway through his term in the state House, in August 1875, a convention was called to rewrite the 1869 Texas State Constitution. Abner was one of three delegates elected to the convention from the Texas State Senate district that made up Harison and Rusk counties. He was the only Republican at the convention who voted for a clause in the state constitution that prohibited the state from spending money for the encouragement of immigration.

After his state legislative term, Abner was the vice president of the Republican State Convention in 1876.

After politics

In 1881, Abner helped establish Bishop College, and served as one of its first trustees. In 1884, his son David Abner, Jr., became the first black man to graduate from a Texas college, and later became president of Guadalupe College and then of Conroe College.

Abner died in 1902 in Marshall, Texas, and is interred there at a family cemetery.

Notes
 Article 16, section 56 of the Texas State Constitution states: "The Legislature shall have no power to appropriate any of the public money for the establishment and maintenance of a bureau of immigration, or for any purpose of bringing immigrants to this State." It was part of the Constitution from 1875 until it was repealed in 2001.

External links

References

1826 births
1902 deaths
Republican Party members of the Texas House of Representatives
African-American politicians during the Reconstruction Era
African-American state legislators in Texas
Politicians from Selma, Alabama
People from Upshur County, Texas
People from Marshall, Texas
Burials in Texas
19th-century American slaves
20th-century African-American people